Bim Skala Bim formed in Boston as a ska band that was influenced by the bands in England’s two-tone movement as well as artists such as the Clash, UB40 and Bob Marley. Their "Boston Blue Beat" sound, a mix of upbeat two-tone ska, rock ‘n’ roll and calypso with a substantial reggae undertone, made them, along with The Toasters, the premier bands kickstarting the third wave of ska in the 1980s. Other bands quickly followed their example resulting in a lively scene in Boston and much of the United States.

In 1997, Bim Skala Bim, the Dropkick Murphys, and the Mighty Mighty Bosstones embarked on a 50-date nationwide "Boston on the Road" tour.

Since their formation in 1983, Bim Skala Bim has released twelve LPs and has been the winner of ten Boston Music Awards and eight Boston Phoenix Reader’s Poll awards, as well as Boston magazine’s "Best of Boston" twice. In March 2013, Boston Business Journal rated Bim Skala Bim’s "Bones" album #19 in their "Boston Top 40 Albums of All Time" list.

Bim Skala Bim went on hiatus in 2002 but reformed to record a new album titled Chet’s Last Call, released late 2013.

The song "Paraguayan Sun" is used as the outro music for the tabletop gaming podcast, "Cast Dice".

Band members

Current
 Dan Vitale (vocals)
 Mark Ferranti (bass)
 Jim Jones (guitar, vocals, 1985–present)
 Jim Arhelger (drums, 1985–present)
 Vinny Nobile (trombone, keyboards, 1986–96, 2000–present)
 Dave Butts (keyboards, saxophone, 2000–present)
 Rick Barry (percussion, 1986 - 1995, 2010-present))

Former
 John Ferry (trombone, vocals, 1983–86, 1998–99)
 Chris Kramtch (drums, 1983)
 Ephraim Lessell (guitar, 1983)
 Robin Ducot (keyboards, 1983–84)
 John Sullivan (drums, 1983–84)
 Will Cluster (guitar, 1983–84)
 Lauren Flesher (vocals, 1985)
 John Cameron (keyboard, saxophone, 1985–99)
 Jackie Starr (vocals, keyboards, 1985–89)
 Rick Barry (percussion, 1986–96)
 Mark Paquin (trombone, 1996–98)
 Chris Rhodes (trombone, 2000)

Discography

Studio albums
 Bim Skala Bim (1986)
 Tuba City (1989)
 How's It Goin'? (1990)
 Bones (1991)
 Eyes & Ears (1995)
 American Playhouse (1995)
 Universal (1997)
 The One That Got Away (1998)
 Krinkle (2000)
 Chet's Last Call (2013)
 Musical Biscuits (2013) (Digital release only)
 Sonic Tonic (2021)

Singles and EPs
 Fat Head (1987)
 Bim Skala Bim / Stabilizer (3) (1991)
 Concert-Freebie: Marquee; Friday 14th July 1995 (1995)
 Skeleton (1995)
 Capone and the Bullets / Bim Skala Bim - Godfather/Sunshine (1996)
 Test Patterns (1999)
 King Hammond, Bim Skala Bim - Mad Not Cancer (2014)

Live albums
 Live at the Paradise (1993)

Compilation appearances 
 Boston Does the Beatles (1988)
 Mashin’ Up The Nation Best of U.S. Ska Vol. 1 (1988)
 Skankin' Round the World, Vol. 1 (1989)
 Place of General Happiness (1993)
 The Shack (1994)
 We Don't Skare (1994)
 Mashin' Up the Nation: The Best of American Ska, Vols. 1&2 (1991)
 Ska: Cover to Cover (1996)
 Joint Ventures in Ska (1996)
 Mash It Up, Vol. 3 (1996)
 SKAndalous: I've Gotcha Covered (1996)
 Mash It Up, Vol. 4 (1997)
 Ska Down Her Way (1997)
 The Ska Parade: Runnin' Naked Thru the Cornfield (1998)
 Big Indie Beats (1998)
 Love and Affection: Ska in the Key of Love (1998)
 Mashin' Up the Nation: The Best of American Ska Vols. 3 & 4 (1998)
 Steady Sounds from the Underground (1998)
 Boston, Vol. 2 (1999)
 Ska Party '99 (1999)
 Club Ska '99: The Shack Vol. 2 (1999)
 Welcome to Beatville (1999)
 Mash It Up 2000 It’s Alive Boston Ska Vol. 5 (2000)
 Still Standing – A North American Ska Uprising (2003)

Awards
 10 Boston Music Awards
 8 Boston Phoenix Reader's Poll Awards
 Boston Magazine's Best of Boston twice
 Boston Business Journal - Bim Skala Bim Bones Album, #19 of Boston Top 40 Albums of All Time
 Top Ten Local Shows for 2014 - Bim Skala Bim at The Middle East Cambridge MA (August 2014)
 Reggae Steady Ska - Best of 2014 - Best Live Band #2 Bim Skala Bim
 Reggae Steady Ska - Best of 2014 - 7" Vinyl of the Year #1 Various: Bim Skala Bim, King Hammond (taken from Specialized 3 - Mad Not Cancer)
 Bim Skala Bim Chet's Last Call debuted on National Jamband.com radio chart at #25 (Marcy 2014)

References

External links

Third-wave ska groups
Musical groups from Boston
American ska musical groups